Maney is a surname. Notable people with the surname include:
C. Joseph Maney (died 1954), American businessman, part-owner of the Boston Braves baseball team
George Earl Maney (1826–1901), American soldier, politician and diplomat
Glen Maney (born 1964), British comedian
James W. Maney (1862–1945), American engineer
Mabel Maney, American artist and author
Patt Maney (born 1948), American military officer, judge, and politician
Vincent Maney (1886–1952), American baseball shortstop